The 2019 LFL US season was the 10th and final season of the Legends Football League (LFL) in the United States. It began April 5 and concluded on August 10.

Developments 
Shortly after the 2018 season ended, the LFL originally elected to hold the 2019 Legends Cup in South Africa's capital city of Johannesburg at Ellis Park Arena. However, this never took place.

In November 2018, defending champion Chicago Bliss head coach Keith Hac and his entire coaching staff resigned in protest of league policies and decisions. Three weeks later the league hired Danville coach JaDae Maguire as a replacement. Maguire did not mesh well with the Bliss and his tenure was short before a new coach, Sidney Lewis, was brought in. In addition to retirements at the end of the previous season, Chicago saw an exodus of many remaining players leaving them with only four returning starters. Chicago would finish the season 0–4, their worst record ever and only their second losing record, and failed to make the playoffs for only the second time ever.

On December 21, 2018, Chris Michaelson, who previously served as the head coach of the Seattle Mist, returned to that franchise as head coach once again. He spent the 2018 season serving as offensive coordinator of the upstart Nashville Knights. For the purpose of rebuilding the Mist franchise to its previous form, Michaelson replaced interim coach Eric Bellamy, who had been named the Mist's interim coach for 2018 after Michelson's supposed retirement in the off-season following a Legends Cup-winning season in 2017. Michaelson previously served as the Mist head coach from 2009 to 2017, leading that franchise to two Legends Cup championship titles.

In early 2019, the LFL announced a new broadcast partner in Honduran television network TDTV.

On June 19, 2019, the league announced a change in the playoff format. Instead of the two best teams from each conference playing for their respective conference titles, the league would abandon the conference titles and pit the top four teams with the best records in an elimination tournament. The team with the best record would play the team with the fourth best record while the teams with the second and third best records would play one another. The immediate effect of this change mid-season was to scramble the playoff standings; Chicago was immediately statistically eliminated, Omaha, which had needed only a victory over winless Denver, suddenly needed to also defeat Atlanta, and Los Angeles could still make the playoffs if Austin beat Nashville in the regular season finale.

Teams

Eastern Conference

Western Conference 

LFL Pro Bowl
Eastern 
Western

Schedule

Regular season

Postseason

Showcase Game

Standings 

x - clinched playoff berth

Playoffs 
Semifinals were played on August 24, 2019, at Toyota Arena in Ontario, California. Legends Cup 2019 was played on September 7, 2019, at the Accesso ShoWare Center in Kent, Washington, instead of South Africa as originally planned. In the 2018 State of the League address delivered by Commissioner Mitchell Mortaza, the 2020 Legends Cup was expected to be the first of upcoming Legends Cups to be played abroad in international destinations; however, that was scrapped when the league decided not to hold its next season. The schedule on LFLUS.com was updated on June 19, 2019, to show the Legends Cup had been moved. On the same day, the league announced the playoff format would change, with the conference championship title removed. Instead, the top teams from both conference would be ranked 1–4, with 1st facing 4th and 2nd facing 3rd.

Awards
League MVP
 Amber Clark - Atlanta Steam
 Miriah Lopez - Los Angeles Temptation
 Jade Randle - Seattle Mist
 Stevi Schnoor - Seattle Mist

Offensive Player of the Year
 Kassandra Bills - Austin Acoustic
 ChrisDell Harris - Austin Acoustic
 Miriah Lopez - Los Angeles Temptation
 Stevi Schnoor - Seattle Mist

Team of the Year
 Austin Acoustic
 Omaha Heart
 Nashville Knights
 Seattle Mist

Defensive Player of the Year
 Alli Alberts - Seattle Mist
 Amber Clark - Atlanta Steam
 Britney Dowdy - Austic Acoustic
 Jade Randle - Seattle Mist

Coach of the Year
 Dontae Allen / Cale Good - Omaha Heart
 Yuri Howard - Nashville Knights
 Chris Michaelson - Seattle Mist
 Mike Olvera - Austin Acoustic

Coaching Staff of the Year
 Atlanta Steam
 Austin Acoustic
 Nashville Knights
 Seattle Mist

In The Trenches (Line)
 Lindsey Burse - Omaha Heart
 Britney Dowdy - Austic Acoustic
 Lauren Jay - Omaha Heart
 Dina Wojowski - Atlanta Steam

Rookie of the Year
 Lauren Crouch - Omaha Heart
 Nicole Hulce - Atlanta Steam
 Bre Mosley - Nashville Knights
 Emma Vanderheyden - Chicago Bliss

Mortaza Award
 Jessica Bateman - Austin Acoustic
 Lindsi Cash - Los Angeles Temptation
 Nicole Curry - Denver Dream
 Austina Mellberg - Nashville Knights

True 8th Man Award
 Jessica Bateman - Austin Acoustic
 Mike McGhee - Seattle Mist
 Jessica Robinson - Atlanta Steam

2015 LFL Hall of Fame Induction
- Danika Brace

Notes 
1.  Omaha finished ahead of Nashville in the standings as a result of their 49-25 head-to-head victory on June 1, 2019.

References

External links
Legends Football League - official website

2019 in American football
Legends Football League